Thanwa Suriyajak (also known as Than; born December 30, 1991, in Pakse, Champasak, Laos), is a Laos actor, singer and model active in Thailand by signing to Channel 7. He is of Thai, Vietnamese, Chinese & French descent.  Movies Hugna Sarakham and Love Summer on the Beach were among his debut works in Thailand.  Thanwa's popularity has currently been on the rise since his works in Lee La Wa Dee Plerng, Fai Rak Game Ron and Rissaya.

Early life and education 
Thanwa was born and raised in Pakse, Champasak, Laos and studied at an international school there before entering the National University in Vientiane. Having a family business in Pakse, Thanwa's father is of Thai, Chinese, & French descent and his mother is of Thai, Chinese, & Vietnamese descent and they also have relatives resided in Ubon Ratchatanee and Bangkok.

Thanwa was scouted into Thai entertainment business by the famous Suppachai Sriwijit talent agents when he visited Thailand during Songkran.  Having decided to come to Thailand to work and study, Thanwa began his career as a model when he was 18.

Thanwa graduated with a bachelor's degree in Communication Arts majoring Film and Video production from Rangsit University, Thailand in 2015 and received a scholarship to continue to study a master's degree in Film production at the same university.

Filmography

Film

Television series 
Broadcast on Channel 7.

Short film

Music video

YouTuber

Discography

Soundtrack

References 

1991 births
Laotian male actors
Living people
Thanwa Suriyajak
Thanwa Suriyajak
Thanwa Suriyajak
Thanwa Suriyajak